The 2017 American Athletic Conference softball tournament was held at the USF Softball Stadium on the campus of South Florida in Tampa, Florida, from May 10 through May 12, 2018.  The event determined the champion of the American Athletic Conference for the 2018 NCAA Division I softball season.  Sixth seeded  won the Tournament for the third year in a row and claimed the American's automatic bid to the 2018 NCAA Division I softball tournament.

Format and seeding
The conference's eight teams were seeded based on conference winning percentage from the round-robin regular season.  The teams then played a single-elimination tournament.

Results

Bracket

Game results

All-Tournament Team
The following players were named to the All-Tournament Team.

Most Outstanding Player
Emily Watson was named Tournament Most Outstanding Player for the second consecutive year.  Watson was a pitcher for Tulsa who earned the win in all three of the Golden Hurricane's wins en route to the title.

References

American Athletic Conference softball tournament
Tournament
AAC softball tournament